The 2 cm KwK 30 L/55 (2 cm Kampfwagenkanone 30 L/55) was a German 2 cm cannon used as the main armament of the German Sd.Kfz.121 Panzerkampfwagen II light tank and various reconnaissance vehicles. It was used during the Spanish Civil War and the Second World War. It was produced by Mauser and Rheinmetall-Borsig from 1935.

The KwK 30 also served as the basis for the 20 mm C/30, an aircraft variant mounted experimentally in some Heinkel He 112 fighters and proved to make an excellent ground-attack weapon during the Spanish Civil War. Direct ground-attack was not considered a priority for the Luftwaffe and thus, the cannon was not used on other designs.

An improved version, the 2 cm KwK 38 L/55 (2 cm Kampfwagenkanone 38 L/55), was used on the Sd.Kfz.121 Panzerkampfwagen II (Ausf. J models onward). It was also used on the Sd.Kfz.251/17 Schützenpanzerwagen (2 cm) anti-aircraft vehicle, which had the gun on a pedestal mounting with a small armored turret to protect the gunner. Late war, it was issued as a platoon commander's vehicle to replace the Sd.Kfz.251/10 Schützenpanzerwagen (3.7 cm PaK).

Ammunition
The 2 cm KwK 30 used the 20 x 138B cartridge. Average penetration performance established against rolled homogenous steel armor plate laid back at 30° from the vertical.

 PzGr.39 (Armour Piercing)  (Can go through 23 mm of armor at 100 meters and 14 mm of armor at 500 meters)
 PzGr.40 (Armour Piercing Composite Rigid) (Can go through 40 mm of armor at 100 meters and 20 mm of armor at 500 meters)
 2 cm Sprgr. 39 (High Explosive)

Vehicles mounted on
 Bergepanther Sd.Kfz.179
 Sd.Kfz.121 Panzerkampfwagen II
 Panzer II Luchs (KwK 38)
 Sd.Kfz.222 Leichter Panzerspähwagen
 Sd.Kfz.231 Schwerer Panzerspähwagen
 Sd.Kfz.232 Schwerer Panzerspähwagen
 Sd.Kfz.234/1
 Sd.Kfz.251/17 Schützenpanzerwagen (2 cm)

References

Tank guns of Germany
World War II artillery of Germany
20 mm artillery
World War II tank guns
Military equipment introduced in the 1930s